Lorelai Alberta Moșneguțu (born 2003, Târgoviște, Dâmbovița) is a Romanian singer and pianist without hands, due to a birth defect. She plays the piano with her feet. At the age of 14, Lorelai won the 7th season of the Romania's Got Talent  obtaining the prize of €120,000.

References 

Living people
2003 births
Romanian amputees
Romanian pianists
People from Târgoviște